In the late 20th and early 21st century, there has been a global movement towards the phase-out of polystyrene foam as a single use plastic (SUP). Full or partial bans of expanded polystyrene foam, like many other single use plastics,  have been enacted nationwide in many countries around the world. Bans for single use plastics have also been enacted at the sub-national or local level in many countries.

Legislation around the world

Summary

Phaseout in the United States

As of 2022, eight U.S. states and one territory have passed legislation to ban polystyrene foam. Maryland was the first state to institute a ban which went into effect on October 1, 2020. In Maine, a ban on polystyrene foam went into effect on July 1, 2021. Vermont passed a ban on polystyrene in 2019, which went into full effect on July 1, 2021. New York's ban went into effect on January 1, 2022. New Jersey's ban on polystyrene foam was passed in 2020 and went into effect on May 4, 2022. Colorado's ban on polystyrene foam was passed in 2021, with the ban taking effect on January 1, 2024. Virginia's ban on polystyrene foam takeout containers was passed by the Virginia General Assembly in 2021 and will go into effect for large businesses by July 2028 and for small businesses by July 2030. In 2021, Washington also passed a polystyrene ban, taking effect in 2023. 

On January 1, 2016, Washington, D.C. banned polystyrene foam takeout containers. On January 1, 2021, the ban was expanded to include retail sale of polystyrene foam.

In California, the legislature passed SB54 in June 2022 as the Plastic Pollution Prevention and Packaging Producer Responsibility Act. The law codifies extended producer responsibility (EPR) requirements for plastics, including a requirement that polystyrene be banned if recycling rates do not reach 25% by 2025. Recycling rates averaged 6% at passage, leading some to call the law a 'de facto ban', anticipating an inability to comply within three years. At least 128 cities in California have an existing polystyrene ban in some form. The City of Berkeley, California, passed the nation's first polystyrene foodware ban in 1988, while also requiring all disposable foodware to be degradable or recyclable. The city of San Marcos, California also passed a polystyrene foam ban in 2021.

Proposed legislation 
As of 2022, proposed legislation banning polystyrene has passed at least one legislative chamber in two states and one territory. In Connecticut, Substitute for SB 118 passed the state Senate in April 2022. The Delaware Senate passed SSB1 for SB 134 in June 2022. The territory of the Northern Mariana Islands passed HB21-89 in its House of Representatives in 2020.

In September 2021, Florida introduced a proposed phaseout of polystyrene foam food packaging. Commissioner of Agriculture Nikki Fried, whose Florida Department of Agriculture and Consumer Services oversees food safety in Florida, proposed a rule to phase out polystyrene in 40,000 grocery stores, food markets, convenience stores, and gas stations that the agency regulates in Florida. The Florida Legislature will consider the proposed rule in 2022.

Summary

See also
Plastic bag ban
Polystyrene
Styrofoam

References

Environmentalism
Foams
Technological phase-outs